Warner Leroy Baxter (March 29, 1889 – May 7, 1951) was an American film actor from the 1910s to the 1940s. Baxter is known for his role as the Cisco Kid in the 1928 film In Old Arizona, for which he won the Academy Award for Best Actor at the 2nd Academy Awards. He frequently played womanizing, charismatic Latin bandit types in Westerns, and played the Cisco Kid or a similar character throughout the 1930s, but had a range of other roles throughout his career.

Baxter began his movie career in silent films with his most notable roles being in The Great Gatsby (1926) and The Awful Truth (1925). Baxter's most notable talkies are In Old Arizona (1929), 42nd Street (1933), Slave Ship (1937) with Wallace Beery, Kidnapped (1938) with Freddie Bartholomew, and the 1931 ensemble short film, The Stolen Jools. In the 1940s, he was well known for his recurring role as Dr. Robert Ordway in the Crime Doctor series of 10 films.

For his contributions to the motion-picture industry, Baxter has a star on the Hollywood Walk of Fame.

Early life
Baxter was born on March 29, 1889. in Columbus, Franklin County, Ohio, to Edwin F. Baxter, born October 1, 1867, Marysville, Union County, Ohio, and Jennie (Jane) B. Barrett, born December 30, 1869, Columbus. Jennie Barrett was the daughter of Leroy Barrett and Hattie Snider. (Note: Ohio Birth Index shows date as March 30, 1889.) Baxter's parents were married May 10, 1888, Columbus. Edwin Baxter owned a cigar stand in Columbus. Edwin F. Baxter, son of William E. Baxter and Mary C. Miller Baxter, died on September 16, 1889, in Columbus. Baxter was not quite five months old when his father died. Baxter's mother survived her son by ten years. Jane/Jennie Barrett Baxter died on March 29, 1962, at her home in Beverly Hills, California. Her cremated remains were inurned at Forest Lawn Memorial Park, Great Mausoleum, Glendale, California, as well as those of his widow, Winifred Bryson Baxter Manger, many years later but in different locations.

Baxter and his mother went to live with her brother in Columbus. They later moved to New York City, where he became active in dramatics, both participating in school productions and attending plays. In 1898, the two moved to San Francisco, where he graduated from Polytechnic High School. When the 1906 San Francisco earthquake struck, Baxter and his mother lived in Golden Gate Park for eight days and then went to live with friends in Alameda for three months. In 1908, they returned to Columbus. After selling farm implements for a living, Baxter worked for four months as the partner of Dorothy Shoemaker in an act on the Keith Vaudeville Circuit.

Film career

Baxter began his film career as an extra in 1914 in a stock company. 

In 1921, Baxter had his first starring role in Sheltered Daughters. That same year he acted in First Love, The Love Charm, and Cheated Hearts.

Baxter would go on to star in 48 features during the 1920s. His most notable silent roles were in The Great Gatsby (1926), Aloma of the South Seas (1926) as an island love interest opposite dancer Gilda Gray, and as an alcoholic doctor in West of Zanzibar (1928) with Lon Chaney.

David Shipman wrote in 1970,"He is the beau ideal, a Valentino without a horse and the costume of a sheik. He is the fellow the girls meet around the corner, that is, if the fellow were Warner Baxter. He is the chap the lonely woman on the prairie sees when she looks at the men's ready-to-wear pages in the latest mail order catalogue"; this appraisal by Jim Tully appeared in Picturegoer in 1936. Baxter was certainly the inspiration for artwork in mail-order catalogues and adverts for pipes, the prototype for men modelling cardigans or pullovers or tweeds. During the early Sound period he was one of Hollywood's leading actors. There was no éclat with him no scandals, no Hollywood careering. Women liked him because he was mature and reliable. He was a good work-horse of an actor, often at the mercy of his material. When it was good, he gave positive, likeable performances. It was a long career but he is hardly remembered today.

Baxter's most notable starring role was as The Cisco Kid in In Old Arizona (1929), the first all-talking Western, for which he won the second Academy Award for Best Actor. He also starred in 42nd Street (1933), Grand Canary (1934), Broadway Bill (1934), and Kidnapped (1938).

By 1936, Baxter was the highest-paid actor in Hollywood, but by 1943, he had slipped to B movie roles, and he starred in a series of Crime Doctor films for Columbia Pictures. Baxter had roles in more than 100 films between 1914 and 1950. In 1936, Baxter had what Leonard Maltin considered his finest job of acting in John Ford's The Prisoner of Shark Island.

Personal troubles and breakdown 
It was about this time that Baxter began to have career and personal troubles. The studio system and being a top leading man with Fox made him wealthy beyond his dreams but it also let him in for some significant personal problems. Baxter said he was envious of his friend, Ronald Colman. "Look at that guy. He only makes one or two pictures a year. I've got to work practically every day in the year." He seemed unable to pry himself away from his salary as a contract star. Some of his best roles in this period were on loan out from his home studio, Fox Picture Corporation. His MGM loan out for Robin Hood of El Dorado was an example. Director William Wellman's recollections in the 2015 biography by his son went into some detail. Baxter, according to Wellman, was aging and troubled by that, as evidenced by a major drinking problem. Baxter told Wellman he was fine during the day but as evening approached he was "gone". Adding to his own insecurities as a leading man, his home studio was not known for having a strong story department. They relied on the formula of having their major stars repeat the same type of stories and characters when it reverberated with an audience. In many cases, even for Will Rogers, it often would decrease the value of the actor's contract. By 1939 he was publicly complaining about being teamed up with new bright and very young actresses as he was advancing in years. He said working with Loretta Young was fine as she had been around since the silent days and fans did not view her as a youngster, but the new crop such as Lynn Bari and Arleen Whelan made him feel very uncomfortable. As his 20th Century Fox contract was nearing completion, he was openly talking of retiring, a decision he was making with his wife, Winifred Bryson. By 1941, columnist Jimmie Fidler was stating the retirement talk was on the level. Some time between Adam Had Four Sons and Lady in the Dark he suffered a mental breakdown. Over the subsequent years he was fairly candid about it in interviews. He said "It's like chasing a rainbow. You never see the end of it. Each part you get has to be better than the last one and before you know it you've got a nervous breakdown."

Between 1935 and 1941, the Internal Revenue Service published annually the individuals with the highest incomes. These amounts may differ from other published sources that are usually higher. Baxter was under contract for a full years service to 20th Century Fox. Normally top talent contracts ran for seven years and allowed for six weeks off per year. The IRS stated in 1935, Baxter made $203,000 ($3,837,319.19 in 2019), 1936 reported $284,000 ($5,315,313.12 in 2019), and for 1937, $225,961 ($4,082,105.70 in 2019). As stated earlier, he was the highest paid contract actor in 1936. In contrast, toward the end of his career, Baxter signed a contract with Columbia Picture Corporation on July 1, 1947, for two pictures per year for the next two years effective December 8, 1947. The terms were that he be paid initially in increments of $12,000 a week the sum of $30,000 ($348,337.37 in 2019) for each picture. He also was to pay 1.5% of his compensation to the Motion Picture Relief Fund. Each picture was to be filmed in  weeks. Principal filming if beyond the  weeks was to be compensated additionally at a rate of $6,000 per week. The US minimum wage in 1947 was $0.40 per hour. The films described were a "Crime Doctor" story based on the radio program of the same name or another so-called "crime" film. He was to be given script approval and star billing above the title. His day was limited to nine hours within a 24-hour period with principal filming to begin at 10 am to include one hour for meals during his workday. The morals clause and a section of negative provisions were lined out. He was also obligated to participate in still photography, advertising and publicity to be in "good taste" and was not to travel by air during principal photography without written permission from the studio. Travel and lodging in excess of 25 miles from the studio would be at studio expense. As was common in this era he was to supply his own modern wardrobe, wearing apparel and shoes if called for by the story. Damage to his own personal wardrobe would be paid for by the studio. Character costumes and shoes would be supplied if necessary by the studio. Baxter was represented by Philip M. Schiefer Agency at 9172 Sunset Boulevard, Los Angeles 46, California.

Baxter was candid in interviews giving credit for his long and financially rewarding career to his wife. "I never take a role until we both talk it over. I have a high opinion of her judgment". He said he no longer cared about high budget films or being a star. "I don't need the money, and I work just to keep interested. I had a good part in a big picture about six years ago. There was tension in making it and I felt myself getting nervous again. I was glad when it was over." Describing his breakdown ten years previously he said he worried and stewed and fussed. "I'd start to walk one way and discover that I was going in the opposite direction. When I thought I was carrying on a conversation, all I was doing was mumbling. I thought I was going crazy." He said all he did for six months was sit and stare into space. They moved to their beach house in Malibu, soaking up the sun and gradually getting better. Baxter felt that the best role in motion pictures was being a leading man in a series. He had reached that conclusion during the production years of the various Crime Doctor films. "It's wonderful. I make two of them a year. Columbia has juggled it so I can make two in a row. That takes about eight weeks of my time. The rest of the year I relax. I travel. I enjoy life".

Between 1930 and 1936, Myrna Loy costarred with Baxter four times: Renegades, Penthouse, Broadway Bill, and To Mary—With Love. She wrote in her 1987 autobiography, "And I have fond memories of Warner, a good actor and a charming man, because we did several pictures together. Renegades was a happy film because of them [Baxter and director Victor Fleming]". Of Renegades, Baxter said it was so hot "they had to keep the cameras packed in ice-bags like a fever patient so the celluloid wouldn't catch fire." Loy liked and respected Baxter, a high-salaried (because he had won an Oscar in 1928 for Old Arizona), competent, and darkly handsome but a rather stiff and bland Ohio native with whom she would appear again. Only two other actors costarred with Loy more often: Clark Gable and William Powell."

Baxter wrote a one-time guest column published in the Saturday Evening Post in 1948, entitled "The Role I Liked Best". He wrote in part, "I must admit that I rate the Kid's [Cisco Kid] first film, In Old Arizona, as my top favorite." He went on to write how in an early "talkie" and the first outdoor talking feature picture made they had to hide microphones in trees and behind rocks at that time. "In Old Arizona started as a two-reeler and we built it up to an eight-reeler. I thoroughly enjoyed the building-up part. It made me feel that I had helped create a new Cisco Kid for the pictures. Then, too, the fact that I got an Oscar for the job caused me no pain." He said this film allowed him to ultimately play the roll of Cisco five times. Arizona Kid in 1930 was the second of five. He liked the warmth and color of the character while modifying O. Henry's story with comedy and drama. In 1945, Baxter said about his Oscar, "My gosh, I don't know. I think it's up in my gun room buried under a heap of maps. I must look and see." In keeping his Oscar in proper perspective, around 1945, Life magazine photographed him with the trophy but never published it. The photo shows Baxter in a club chair in his Beverly Hills home looking fondly at his dog, an American Cocker Spaniel, on the floor. The dog's leash is anchored to his gold Oscar and sitting on the floor with the dog.

Baxter became for the first time a radio actor on May 24, 1934. After years of declining such offers he appeared on Hollywood Hotel as the guest of the show's host, Louella O. Parsons. He and his film co-star Ketti Gallian, performed several scenes from their soon-to-be-released film, Under the Pampas Moon.

For a number of years stunt man and western actor Frank McGrath (actor), known best for his roll portraying Charlie Wooster on the TV series Wagon Train, was a stand-in and stunt double for Baxter. He so greatly resembled Baxter that they could have passed for brothers, according to Los Angeles Times reporter John Scott's 1935 article. The two men formed a friendship outside of the studios and McGrath worked in several capacities for him away from filming. Studio still photos exist today from the 20th Century Fox film Slave Ship (1937) showing identically dressed Baxter and McGrath looking like brothers. In late 1938, McGrath gave an extensive interview carried by the Associated Press. He said they had met in 1928. Baxter was taken by their resemblance to each other and had him used as a stand-in. If closer in age, they could have passed for twin brothers. In 1935, that professional relationship was written into Baxter's contracts. By 1938, McGrath was being paid $150 per week ($2,762.32 in 2019), part by Baxter and part by his studio to be a stand-in, stunt double, personal trainer, and occasional body guard. In that era stand-ins usually were paid $35 per week. They did much together to maintain Baxter's fitness—swimming, tennis, and boxing. Baxter also was a bicycle enthusiast. A personal friendship grew from that. They hunted several times a year in addition to fishing trips. It was on a hunting trip to a remote part of Colorado in 1934 when McGrath saved Baxter's life. Baxter had broken his leg and McGrath carried him for four days on his back out of the wilderness and to a hospital. It was that event that cemented the personal friendship. When asked what they would talk about, McGrath said anything but pictures.

Personal life
Baxter married Viola Caldwell in 1911, but they were soon separated and then divorced in 1913. He married actress Winifred Bryson in 1918, remaining married until his death in 1951. Through his marriage to Bryson he was an uncle by marriage to actress Betty Bryson. Betty Bryson was born Elizabeth Bryson Meikklejohn, daughter of Winifred's sister, Vivian.

On August 5, 1931, Baxter survived uninjured with 40 other cast and crew members the train derailment of the Southern Pacific Argonaut east of Yuma on route to Tucson for location shooting for "The Cisco Kid" (1931). Two trainmen were killed in the derailment. Baxter, Conchita Montenegro, and Edmund Lowe were among the passengers in cars at the end of the train.

The Baxter beach house was at 77 Malibu Beach, Malibu, California for many years as noted in the 1942 voter roll for Malibu. He also had a cabin in the San Jacinto Mountains. He was very active in Malibu civic affairs and was named Honorary Mayor of Malibu from 1946, replacing Brian Donlevy, through 1949. For a number of years he had an 80-acre working ranch about 12 miles north of Palm Springs at Desert Hot Springs, the Warner Baxter Ranch, later renamed the Circle B Ranch. It was used for years as a location for western films. It was listed for sale in mid 1945 for a price of $40,000 and sold over a year later. It was listed as having a large and comfortable house of four bedrooms and laid out for entertaining along with a caretaker's house. It was sold furnished. During the war he was chairman of the Malibu Rationing Board and also did some troop entertaining in Army camps in the Fresno and Bakersfield areas. He and his entertainers put on dozens of day and night shows for the service men.

He was a close friend of William Powell, with whom he had starred in three silent films, the best of which was "The Great Gatsby" now considered lost. He was at Powell's side when Jean Harlow died in 1937. His friendship with Ronald Colman was perhaps even deeper. While tennis and the film industry were the origins of their friendship going back to their earlier days at Paramount Studios, Colman and his wife Benita Hume named Baxter and Tim McCoy as godfathers to their daughter, Juliet Benita Colman, at her christening in 1944. Juliet Colman's biography of her father describes in detail the very private social circle of cocktails, dinner and games of tennis or poker held between her father's Hollywood house at 2092 Mound Street above and behind the Castle Argyle, and Baxter's home on South Beachwood Drive.

When not acting, Baxter was an inventor who co-created a searchlight for revolvers in 1935, which allowed a shooter to more clearly see a target at night. He also developed a radio device that allowed emergency crews to change traffic signals from two blocks away, providing them with safe passage through intersections. He financed the device's installation at a Beverly Hills intersection in 1940.

Death 
Baxter suffered from arthritis for several years, and in 1951, he underwent a lobotomy as a last resort to ease the chronic pain. On May 7, 1951, he died of pneumonia at age 62 and was interred in Forest Lawn Memorial Park Cemetery in Glendale, California. His grave is located in a gated and locked private section, Garden of Memory. His bronze headstone has a reproduction of his signature. The remaining inscription is in the handwriting of his wife, Winifred Bryson Baxter.

Warner Leroy Baxter's death certificate stated the following:  He died at his residence on May 7, 1951, at 5:50 pm, 911 North Roxbury Drive, Beverly Hills, California. The informant was Philip M. Schiefer (his manager).

His funeral was held at the Wee Kirk O' The Heather chapel at Forest Lawn Memorial Park in Glendale, California on May 11, 1951. The service was conducted by Dr. Franklin Kelly  of Christ Church, Unity. The Los Angeles Times noted that the private funeral service was markedly reminiscent of the film capital's earlier days. Among his pallbearers were long time close friends Ronald Colman, William Powell, and Tim McCoy. He was buried in a bronze casket with a portrait of his wife.

Prior to his death he was reported on February 6, 1951, to being "seriously ill" with a "chronic illness" in hospital since January 18, 1951. It mentions he was much improved and celebrated his 33rd wedding anniversary on January 29. On April 8, 1951, the L. A. Times reported the actor being ill at home the last month. His doctors John Sharpe and Richard Barton reported his "condition is steadily becoming more critical." On April 21, 1951, the L. A. Times reported that Baxter was out of the hospital following "a cranial nerve operation" described as a "complete success" by Phil Schaefer, Baxter's manager. He said Baxter "had suffered for years from a chronic illness which caused eating difficulties and induced malnutrition."

On June 13, 1951, his last will and testament dated April 10, 1946 was entered into probate at Los Angeles. He left all his property to his wife and no valuation was made in the documents other than stating it will exceed $10,000. His obituary stated in recent years he had long been interested in real estate and business projects.

On the evening of October 15, 1953, his widow, Winifred Bryson Baxter married Ferdinand Herman Menger (December 22, 1910 – October 17, 1991) at the Desert Inn in Las Vegas, Nevada. Menger was an architect from St. Louis, Missouri, and they would remain married until the end of her life.

Recognition
In 1960, Baxter posthumously received a motion pictures star on the Hollywood Walk of Fame at 6284 Hollywood Boulevard.

Filmography

See also
 List of actors with Academy Award nominations

Note

References

External links

Photographs of Warner Baxter
 Warner Baxter and his mother Jane tour the Fox lot in Hollywood: #1...#2(Wayback)

American male stage actors
American male film actors
American male silent film actors
Best Actor Academy Award winners
Burials at Forest Lawn Memorial Park (Glendale)
Male actors from Columbus, Ohio
Vaudeville performers
Deaths from pneumonia in California
1889 births
1951 deaths
1906 San Francisco earthquake survivors
20th-century American male actors
Lobotomised people
20th-century American inventors